Western Goals Foundation was a private domestic intelligence agency active in the United States. It was founded in 1979 by Major General John K. Singlaub, the publisher and spy John H. Rees, and Congressman Larry McDonald. It went defunct in 1986 when the Tower Commission revealed it had been part of Oliver North's Iran–Contra funding network.

History 
After the Watergate and COINTELPRO scandals of the early 1970s, several laws were passed to restrict police intelligence gathering within political organizations and tried to make it necessary to demonstrate that a criminal act was likely to be uncovered by any intelligence gathering proposed. Many files on radicals, collected for decades, were ordered destroyed. The unintended effect of the laws was to privatize the files in the hands of 'retired' intelligence officers and their operatives.

As a private foundation, Western Goals collected information about alleged subversives and passed the information to law enforcement officials, akin to a "mini-deep state". According to former employees, agencies receiving information from Western Goals included the Drug Enforcement Agency, Bureau of Alcohol, Tobacco, Firearms and Explosives, Federal Bureau of Investigation, Central Intelligence Agency, and police departments.

John Rees and Larry McDonald joined with Major General Singlaub to form Western Goals in 1979. Each founder was also a member of the World Anti-Communist League, the John Birch Society, and similar organizations. One of its principal sponsors was the Texan billionaire Nelson Bunker Hunt.

The organization was based in a townhouse in Alexandria, Virginia. It also said it had offices in West Germany and Austria. A former employee told Politico in 2018 that more of its funding came from West Germany than the United States. 

Rees set up a computer database to track suspected radicals, and wrote many of Western Goals' published reports about domestic subversives, terrorism and communist threats. People in law enforcement sometimes leaked derogatory intelligence to Western Goals, which Rees then published in newsletters, which in turn were entered into the Congressional Record by McDonald, which shielded him from libel. Western Goals would then cite McDonald’s statements in its own public reports. Unverified reports by Western Goals accusing American pacifist groups of ties to communism and the Soviet Union were also publicized in Reader's Digest and by the Reagan administration.

Western Goals was sued by the American Civil Liberties Union (ACLU) after a police officer was caught adding information from the disbanded Los Angeles Police Department "Red Squad" to a related computer bulletin board system.

Western Goals raised funds for the Nicaraguan Contras starting in 1983, after Congress banned the Reagan administration from providing U.S. support. A Contra brigade of 2,000 was named the Larry McDonald Task Force to honor the Western Goals co-founder, who had been killed in the Soviet downing of Korean Air Lines Flight 007. Singlaub was an intermediary in Oliver North’s illegal weapons network for the Contras. Officials of the foundation were questioned in the Iran-Contra hearings of 1986.

The organization founded an offshoot, Western Goals (UK), later the Western Goals Institute, which was briefly influential in British Conservative politics.

Advisory board and directors

Bibliography

Books
Ally Betrayed: Nicaragua (1989). Foreword by U.S. Ambassador Earl E. T. Smith. U.S. ed. postscript by Turner B. Shelton. Nicaragua ed. postscript by Francisco Urcuyo Maliaños. 112 pages. .
Ally Betrayed: The Republic of China (1982), by David Nelson Rowe. Foreword by Anthony Kubek. Afterword by Patricia Hurley. 107 pages. .
Ally Betrayed: The Republic of Korea (1982), by David Nelson Rowe. Foreword by Major General John K. Singlaub. Postscript by Congressman Bob Stump. 106 pages. .
Red Tide Rising in the Carolinas (1980). 26 pages. .
Broken Seals: A Western Goals Foundation Report on the Attempts to Destroy the Foreign and Domestic Intelligence Capabilities of the U.S. (1980). Introduction by Congressman John M. Ashbrook. Afterword by Lt. Gen. Daniel O. Graham. 110 pages..
Red Locusts: Soviet Support for Terrorism in South Africa (1981). Foreword by U.S. Senator Jesse Helms. Postscript by Ambassador Marion Smoak.
Soviet Active Measures Against the United States (1984). 120 pages.

Films
No Place to Hide: The Strategy and Tactics of Terrorism (1982). Written, produced, and hosted by G. Edward Griffin. Directed by Dick Quincer. 58 min. . Transcript .
The Subversion Factor: A History of Treason in Modern America (1983). Written and hosted by G. Edward Griffin. 120 min. . Transcript  . Part 1: Moles in High Places. Part 2: The Open Gates of Troy.

See also
John Birch Society
Western Goals Institute
Western Islands (publisher)
World Anti-Communist League

Further reading
Berlet, Chip (Summer 1985). "Private Spies". Shmate: A Journal of Progressive Jewish Thought, no. 11/12.
Berlet, Chip (Deb. 2, 1993). "How Government Intelligence Agencies and Private Right-wing Counter-subversion Groups Forge Ad Hoc Covert Spy Networks that Target Dissidents as Outlaws". Political Research Associates.
Manzione, Elton (Summer 1985). "The Private Spy Agency". National Reporter. pp. 34-39.

References

External links
Western Goals at Powerbase.info
Western Goals at Militarist Monitor
Works published by Western Goals at WorldCat

Political organizations based in the United States
Anti-communist organizations in the United States
Surveillance scandals
1979 establishments in the United States
1986 disestablishments in the United States
Law enforcement scandals
Iran–Contra affair
Conservative organizations in the United States
Organizations established in 1979
Organizations disestablished in 1986